Chimbas is a city located in the Chimbas Department, in the San Juan Province of Argentina. It is located in the northern sector of the urban agglomeration of Greater San Juan.

References 

Populated places in San Juan Province, Argentina